John Dolan Bookman (September 6, 1932 – October 23, 1995) was a professional American football cornerback in the National Football League (NFL) and the American Football League (AFL). He played for three seasons for the NFL's New York Giants and the AFL's Dallas Texans and New York Titans.

External links

1932 births
1995 deaths
Players of American football from Baton Rouge, Louisiana
American football cornerbacks
Miami Hurricanes football players
New York Giants players
Dallas Texans (AFL) players
New York Titans (AFL) players